Seear is a surname. Notable people with the surname include:

Gary Seear (1952–2018), New Zealand rugby player
Maxine Seear (born 1984), Australian triathlete
Nancy Seear, Baroness Seear (1913–1997), British social scientist and politician
Noot Seear (born 1983), Canadian model and actress